The Central District of Delfan County is a district (bakhsh) in Delfan County, Lorestan Province, Iran. At the 2006 census, its population was 113,787, in 24,683 families.  The District has one city: Nurabad. The District is subdivided into six Rural Districts: Khaveh-ye Jonubi Rural District, Khaveh-ye Shomali Rural District, Mirbag-e Jonubi Rural District, Mirbag-e Shomali Rural District, Nurabad Rural District, and Nurali Rural District.

References 

Districts of Lorestan Province
Delfan County